Marvel's 616 is an anthology documentary television series by Marvel New Media and Supper Club for Disney+ that premiered on November 20, 2020. The name "616" refers to Earth-616, the fictional universe in which Marvel Comics is set. On November 20, executive producer Joe Quesada said that it was "definitely" possible that the show could be renewed for a second season. The show has not yet been officially renewed for season two.

Each episode focuses on a different interesting aspect of the Marvel Universe; for example, the first episode of the series is about the Japanese version of Spider-Man (Supaidāman). Other episodes revolve around Marvel cosplay, Marvel action figures, and even a Marvel Comics-themed musical. The show was also generally well received, with reviewers appreciating the style and tone of the series.

Premise 
Marvel's 616 portrays eight amazing stories illustrating some of the most interesting and unknown pockets of the Marvel Universe. It also explores the universe's "rich legacy of pioneering characters, creators, and storytelling to reflect the world outside your window."

Episodes

Production 
Production took place under the supervision of Marvel New Media and Supper Club. The show was announced along with Marvel's Hero Project, another Marvel documentary series, which was to be released when Disney+ was launched in November 2019. In addition, on November 21, 2020, a day after the series premiered, one poster for each episode was revealed. The entirety of the series, eight episodes, was released on November 20, 2020, on Disney+.

Notable directors from the series include Marvel Comics collaborator and actor Paul Scheer and Community's Gillian Jacobs, who also acted in the third reboot of The Twilight Zone and Mike McMahan's Rick and Morty. In addition, Marvel Comics creator Stan Lee appears through archival footage. Many guest stars appear in the series in interviews, such as Sara Amanat and Lorraine Cink. The day that the first season premiered on Disney+, executive producer Joe Quesada noted that a second season of the show was "definitely" possible.

Reception

Critical reception 
On Rotten Tomatoes, the series holds an approval rating of 100% based on six reviews, with an average rating of 9.50/10. Metacritic, which uses a weighted average, assigned the series a score of 84 out of 100, based on four critics, indicating "universal acclaim."

Caroline Framke of Variety found the stories provided by the anthology documentary fascinating, writing, "Marvel's 616" might not convince someone with little to no interest in comics of their potential virtue, but it's not trying to. Instead, it uses the vast records at its disposal to build a living history to show how, and why, Marvel has become such an unstoppable behemoth, doubters be damned." Kelsey Endter of CosplayCentral.com reviewed the fifth episode of the series "Suit Up!" positively, noting that the episode was "truly special" because it highlighted five New York Comic Con Marvel costume cosplayers, including StrongInCostume and ZiaCosplay. Drew Taylor of Collider gave the series an "A" rating and complimented how the series approaches the history of Marvel, claiming, "These documentaries are lengthy, highly detailed, and totally dissimilar from one installment to the next. It's an exhilarating watch, with each installment offering the thrill of the unexpected and the promise of even more surprises to come." Sam Barsanti of The A.V. Club gave the series an "A-" rating and stated that the show avoids mythologizing Marvel and succeeds to approach its universe, saying, "You might not walk away with a grand cohesive understanding of how Marvel has impacted the lives of its fans and employees, but you will come away with a very specific understanding of how it has impacted specific fans and employees in related and heartwarming ways." Ashley Moulton of Common Sense Media rated the series 4 out of 5 stars and complimented the series for its promotion of teamwork and creativity, indicating, "Detailed behind-the-scenes showcase fun for Marvel fans."

Richard Trenholm of CNET pointed out that certain fans of Marvel questioned the company's decision to feature Dan Slott in the seventh episode, titled "The Marvel Method," as it depicts him writing very slowly and putting those who work around him in dire situations by doing this, and some readers wondered if Slott was even working, or just slacking off. Josh Bell of CBR.com found that the series did not engage enough with the history of Marvel, indicating, "While just because the series accentuates the positive doesn't mean it can't be insightful, a lot of the content is superficial and bland, even if it's easy to watch thanks to the slick, engaging production."

Accolades

References

External links 
 
 

2020s American documentary television series
2020 American television series debuts
American documentary television series
Disney+ original programming
English-language television shows
Marvel Entertainment